The Duty to Live is a 1919 German silent film directed by Carl Wilhelm and starring Magnus Stifter, Margarete Schön, Reinhold Schünzel.

Cast

References

Bibliography

External links

1919 films
Films of the Weimar Republic
German silent feature films
Films directed by Carl Wilhelm
German black-and-white films
1910s German films